The Rossoschka German War Cemetery is located 37 kilometers northwest of the city center of Volgograd on the Rossoschka river. It is a resting place and a place of remembrance for those who died in the Battle of Stalingrad and for those missing whose bodies could not be recovered. The Soviet war cemetery Rossoshka is also located nearby and contains Russian burials from the same battle.

65,000 German soldiers are reported to be buried at Rossoschka, and in September 2019, 1,837 more soldiers were laid to rest there, these soldiers remains had been discovered in a mass grave in Stalingrad a year earlier (25 September 2018) while moving a water pipeline.

The cemetery is maintained by the German War Graves Commission.

References

External links
 

German War Graves Commission
Cemeteries in Russia
Military cemeteries
Military history of Germany
World War II cemeteries